Nayel Nassar (born 21 January 1991) is an Egyptian American professional equestrian. He first began riding at age five and jumping at ten.  Nassar qualified for the International Federation for Equestrian Sports (FEI) Show Jumping World Cup Finals in 2013, 2014, and 2017, and the FEI World Equestrian Games in 2014. He competed at the Longines FEI World Cup Finals in Paris and regularly competes on the international Grand Prix circuit.

Career
Nassar took home the $400,000 Longines Grand Prix of New York, the grand finale of the Longines Masters of New York. He is the first rider to win the Longines Speed Challenge and the Longines Grand Prix at the same event and the first to do it with the same horse.

In 2012, he won the Artisan Farms Young Rider Grand Prix Series at the Winter Equestrian Festival. 

Nassar qualified for the International Federation for Equestrian Sports (FEI) Show, Jumping World Cup Finals in 2013, 2014, and 2017, and the FEI World Equestrian Games in 2014. In addition, he competed at the Longines FEI World Cup Finals in Paris. Also, he regularly competes on the international Grand Prix circuit.

In February 2019, he won the cup at the Longines FEI World Cup Jumping Wellington after he finished the race in 38.15 seconds. In 2012, he won the Artisan Farms Young Rider Grand Prix Series at the Winter Equestrian Festival. He represented Egypt at the 2012 London Summer Olympics.

Career highlights include: 1st place on Lordan – Longines FEI Jumping World Cup Las Vegas; 1st place – Las Vegas National Horse Show Winning Round CSI 3; 1st place  – Longines FEI Jumping World Cup Del Mar; 7th place – Longines FEI Jumping World Cup Langley; 2nd place – Longines Global Champions Tour (LGCT) Valkenswaard CSI 5; 2019 LGCT Hamburg Silver Medalist; 1st place –  New York Masters CSI 5 (5-star) Grand Prix; 1st place  – Rabat CSIO4 Designated Olympic Qualifier.

In August 2021, Nassar qualified for the Final of the Tokyo 2020 Olympics with no penalties, riding his Best horse Igor at Equestrian Park. He participated in the 2020 Summer Olympic Games for Egypt, participating in the Individual Equestrian Jumping finals; he came in 24th place, receiving no Olympic medal.

Nassar established his stables back in 2015 and called them Nthemsar Stables. The stables are located in Southern California. The business is based in the city of Encinitas in San Diego County.

Personal life
Nassar was born in Chicago and grew up in Kuwait before moving back to the United States, in California, in 2009. He was born to Fouad Nassar, and Iman Harby, owners of Kuwaiti architectural firm Diwan Interiors International, which has worked with companies such as Citigroup Kuwait, JW Marriott, and Mercedes Benz.

He first began riding at the age of five and jumping at ten. Nassar has published that on his Instagram page many times, and he is always proud to say that he's been an equestrian since day one.

Nassar is a graduate of Stanford University. He earned his bachelor's degree in economics from Stanford in 2013.

On 29 January 2020, Nassar and Jennifer Gates, daughter of Bill and Melinda Gates, announced their engagement. They married on 16 October 2021 in Westchester County, New York.

External links
Nayel Nassar Home Page

References

American male equestrians
Egyptian male equestrians
Equestrians at the 2020 Summer Olympics
Living people
Olympic equestrians of Egypt
1991 births